Freziera biserrata is a species of plant in the Pentaphylacaceae family. It is endemic to Costa Rica.

References

Endemic flora of Costa Rica
biserrata
Vulnerable plants
Taxonomy articles created by Polbot